Rineloricaria maquinensis is a species of catfish in the family Loricariidae. It is a freshwater fish native to South America, where it occurs in the basins of the Maquiné River and the Araranguá River in Brazil. It is typically found in small creeks with clear, shallow water and rocky substrates. The species reaches 8.5 cm (3.3 inches) in standard length and is believed to be a facultative air-breather.

References 

Loricariini

Fish described in 2001
Freshwater fish of Brazil
Catfish of South America